In geology and geomorphology a pediplain (from the Latin pes, genitive case pedis, meaning "foot") is an extensive plain formed by the coalescence of pediments. The processes through which pediplains forms is known as pediplanation. The concepts of pediplain and pediplanation were first developed by geologist Lester Charles King in his 1942 book South African Scenery. The concept gained notoriety as it was juxtaposed to peneplanation.

The coalesced pediments of the pediplains may form a series of very gentle concave slopes. Pediplains main difference to W. M. Davis’ peneplains is in the history and processes behind, and less so in the final shape. Perhaps the most notable difference in form that may be present is that of residual hills which in Davis’ peneplains are to have gentle slopes while in pediplains they ought to have the same steepness as the slopes in the early stages of erosion leading to pediplanation.

Pediplanation is linked to scarp retreat in the following way: as scarps retreat over geological time pediments migrate and extend over large areas. The result is that the surface is eroded chiefly backward and that downward erosion is limited. In contrast to common peneplain conceptualizations several pediplains might form simultaneously at different altitudes and do not necessarily grade to a base level. Pediplains are normally formed in areas of arid and semi-arid climate. As climate changes arid and semi-arid periods of pediplanation may alternate with more humid periods of etchplanation resulting in the formation of flattish surfaces (peneplains) of mixed origin (polygenetic).

Cryoplanation is a variant of pediplanation that is restricted to cold climates.

Examples
South Sudan

See also

Notes

References

Planation surfaces
Erosion landforms